
Gmina Poronin is a rural gmina (administrative district) in Tatra County, Lesser Poland Voivodeship, in southern Poland.

Villages
Gmina Poronin contains the villages and settlements of Bustryk, Małe Ciche, Murzasichle, Nowe Bystre, Suche and Ząb.

Neighbouring gminas
Gmina Poronin is bordered by the town of Zakopane and by the gminas of Biały Dunajec, Bukowina Tatrzańska, Czarny Dunajec and Kościelisko.

References
 Polish official population figures 2006

Poronin
Tatra County